Brede is both a surname and a masculine Norwegian given name. Notable people with the name include:

Surname:
Anita Schjøll Brede (born 1985), Norwegian entrepreneur
Ardell Brede (born 1939), American politician
Brent Brede (born 1971), American baseball player
Herbert Brede (1888–1942), Estonian general

Given name:
Brede Arkless (1939–2006), British rock climber
Brede Bomhoff (born 1976), Norwegian footballer
Brede Frettem Csiszar, Norwegian ice hockey player
Brede Hangeland (born 1981), Norwegian footballer

Norwegian masculine given names
Norwegian-language surnames